Benhall Green is a village in Suffolk, England. Benhall Green has a ford over the Fromus - which can be treacherous during heavy rains - and several protected wildlife sites, including the Wadd. The village also has a St Mary's Benhall Primary school, rated excellent by Ofsted , a new wooden play area, swings and slides, a phone box, and a noticeboard. There is a small farm shop on the A12 just outside the village, the Railway Farm Shop. In the village is a cottage built in 1698 with distinctive pargeting.

Flower Show
Each year in August, the village holds the Annual Memorial Flower Show. This event is widely supported and includes a produce show and a number of  categories that children can enter. The show begins with a colourful procession through the village.

References

External links
  Benhall & Sternfield Website

Villages in Suffolk